Johannes Kraan (born 5 October 1901 in Narva) was an Estonian politician and member of V Riigikogu, joining on the 21st of June 1934. He represented the Estonian Socialist Workers' Party. He was the successor of August Gustavson and on 3 July 1934, resigned from his position and was replaced by Johannes Hiob.

References

1901 births
Year of death missing
Politicians from Narva
People from Yamburgsky Uyezd
Estonian Socialist Workers' Party politicians
Members of the Riigikogu, 1932–1934